Punch is the name of two brands of cigars, one produced on the island of Cuba for Habanos SA, the Cuban state-owned tobacco company, and the other produced in Honduras for General Cigar Company.

History 

The Punch brand was first registered in 1840 by German named Stockmann and named for the European puppet show character, Mr. Punch (not the magazine, which was created a year later).  The brand quickly became a success, especially in Great Britain.  The first change of ownership came in 1874, when the brand was bought by a Luis Corujo, and again in 1884, when the brand was purchased by Manuel López Fernández and its bands and boxes still bear his name to this day.  Retiring in 1924 and dying shortly after, López gave ownership of the brand to Esperanza Valle Comas, who only held it for a few years before the Stock Market Crash of 1929.

Like most other businesses around the world, the Cuban cigar industry faced financial hardships.  In 1930, the firm of Fernández, Palicio y Cía bought up the brand, where it became one of the company's headlining cigar marques, along with Belinda, La Escepción, and Hoyo de Monterrey, and maintained its popularity with British cigar smokers.

After the embargo was set against Cuba by the United States, Fernando Palicio fled Cuba for Florida, where he subsequently sold his cigar lines to Frank Llaneza and Dan Blumenthal of Villazon & Co., which has continued to make Punch, Hoyo de Monterrey, and Belinda cigars from Honduran tobacco for the American market.

Cuba subsequently nationalized the tobacco industry and Punch continued production and is still a popular, multi-locally-marketed Cuban cigar line.  Among connoisseurs, the eponymous Punch, Double Corona, Churchill, and Super Selection No. 2 are especially prized and sought after.

Punch also produces two machine-made cigarillos: the Cigarritos and Cigarritos Reserva.

Punch has two Edición Limitada production cigars. One was released in 2013, and the other in 2017. It is also extremely popular as a brand for the Edicion Regional series of cigars produced by Habanos for local markets.

Vitolas in the Punch Line

The following list of vitolas de salida (commercial vitolas) within the Punch marque lists their size and ring gauge in Imperial (and Metric), their vitolas de galera (factory vitolas), and their common name in American cigar slang.

Hand-Made Vitolas
 Churchill - 7" × 47 (178 × 18.65 mm), Julieta No. 2, a churchill
 Corona - 5" × 42 (143 × 16.67 mm), Corona, a corona
 Coronation - 5" × 42 (130 × 16.67 mm), Petit Corona, a petit corona
 Double Corona - 7" × 49 (194 × 19.45 mm), Prominente, a double corona
 Margarita - 4" × 26 (121 × 10.32 mm), Carolina, a small panetela
 Petit Corona del Punch - 5" × 42 (130 × 16.67 mm), Mareva, a petit corona
 Petit Coronation - 4" × 40 (117 × 15.88 mm), Coronita, a petit corona
 Petit Punch - 4" × 40 (102 × 15.88 mm), Perla, a tres petit corona
 Punch - 5" × 46 (143 × 18.26 mm), Corona Gorda, a grand corona
 Royal Coronation - 5" × 44 (146 × 17.46 mm), Conserva, a long corona
 Royal Selection No. 11 - 5" × 46 (143 × 18.26 mm), Corona Gorda, a grand corona
 Royal Selection No. 12 - 5" × 42 (130 × 16.67 mm), Mareva, a petit corona
 Super Selection No. 1 - 6" × 42 (156 × 16.67 mm), Corona Grande, a long corona

Edición Limitada Releases
 Serie d'Oro No. 2 (2013) - 5" × 50 (140 × 20 mm), Campanas, a pyramid or torpedo
 Regios de Punch (2017) - 4" × 48 (120 × 19.1 mm), Hermoso Especial, a corona extra

Edición Regional Releases
 Superfino (Italy 2005, 2006) - 4" × 42 (110 × 16.67 mm), Minuto, a tres petit corona
 Robusto (Switzerland 2005, 2007) - 4" × 50 (124 × 19.84 mm), Robusto, a robusto
 Super Robusto (Asia Pacific 2006, 2007) - 6" × 50 (155 × 19.84 mm) Doble, a toro
 Robusto (United Arab Emirates 2008) - 4" × 50 (124 × 19.84 mm), Robusto, a robusto
 Serie d'Oro No. 1 (UK 2008) - 6" × 52 (156 × 20.64 mm) Pirámide, a pyramid or torpedo
 Punch Royal (Benelux 2009) - 5" × 50 (141 × 19.84 mm) Goridto, a robusto extra
 Small Club (France 2009) - 4" × 50 (102 × 19.84 mm) Petit Robusto, a petit robusto
 Platino (India 2009) - 7" × 49 (194 × 19.45 mm) Prominente, a double corona
 Diadema (Italy 2009) - 9" × 55 (233 × 21.83 mm) Diadema, a diadema
 Northern Lights (Nordic Countries 2009) - 4" × 52 (110 × 20.64 mm) Petit Edmundo, a petit robusto
 Poderoso (Switzerland 2009) - 6" × 54 (164 × 21.43 mm) Sublime, a toro

Footnotes
 Min Ron Nee with Adriano Martinez Ruis, An Illustrated Encyclopaedia of Post-Revolution Havana Cigars. Hong Kong: Interpro Business Corp., 2003.

See also 
 Cigar brands

References

External links
 Official website of Habanos S.A.
 Punch on the Cuban Cigar Website
 Cuban Cigars
 List of Punch cigar names, sizes and information
 Punch Cigars Reviews

Habanos S.A. brands